Chaman-e Amirabad (also Romanized as Chaman-e Amīrābād; also known as Amīrābād) is a village in Chuqur Rural District, Tarom Sofla District, Qazvin County, Qazvin Province, Iran. At the 2006 census, its population was 87, in 19 families.

References 

Populated places in Qazvin County